Sergelen is a sum (district) of Dornod Province in eastern Mongolia. In 2009, its population was 2,198.

History 
Khogne District, founded in 1931, and Kherlenbayan District, founded in 1946, were merged together in 1961 to form Sergelen District, centered on the slopes of Sergelen Kharat Mountain.

References 

Districts of Dornod Province